Nowy Dwór  is a village in the administrative district of Gmina Chojnice, within Chojnice County, Pomeranian Voivodeship, in northern Poland. It is located within the historic region of Pomerania.

The village has a population of 127.

Nowy Dwór was a royal village of the Polish Crown, administratively located in the Człuchów County in the Pomeranian Voivodeship.

Notable people
  (ca. 1552–1625), Polish military leader and publicist, Knight of Malta, born in the village

References

Villages in Chojnice County